The following lists events that happened during 1968 in the Grand Duchy of Luxembourg.

Incumbents

Events
 6 April – Representing Luxembourg, Chris Baldo and Sophie Garel finish eleventh in the Eurovision Song Contest 1968 with the song Nous vivrons d'amour.
 5 August – A law reforming secondary education is passed.
 5 October – A law changing the criteria for eligibility to sit in the Chamber of Deputies is passed.
 29 October – Disagreements over the budget for the following year lead to the collapse of the Werner-Cravatte Ministry.
 15 December – Legislative elections are held.  In the Chamber of Deputies, the DP wins five extra seats, reversing their losses in 1964.
 16 December – Paul Wilwertz resigns from the Council of State to take up his seat in the Chamber of Deputies.

Births

Deaths

Footnotes

References